The 19th Golden Horse Awards (Mandarin:第19屆金馬獎) took place on October 24, 1982, at Sun Yat-sen Memorial Hall in Taipei, Taiwan.

References

19th
1982 film awards
1982 in Taiwan